The men's 200 metres event  at the 1982 European Athletics Indoor Championships was held on 6–7 March. It was the first time that this event was held at the European Athletics Indoor Championships.

Medalists

Results

Heats
The winner of each heat (Q) and the next 2 fastest (q) qualified for the semifinals.

Semifinals
First 2 from each semifinal qualified directly (Q) for the final.

Final

References

200 metres at the European Athletics Indoor Championships
200